William Joseph Milligan (August 19, 1878 – October 14, 1928) was an American Major League Baseball pitcher. He played for the Philadelphia Athletics during the  season and the New York Giants during the  season.

References

External links

Major League Baseball pitchers
Philadelphia Athletics players
New York Giants (NL) players
Baseball players from New York (state)
1878 births
1928 deaths
Springfield Ponies players
Buffalo Bisons (minor league) players
Palmyra Mormans players
Scranton Miners players
Indianapolis Hoosiers (minor league) players
Providence Grays (minor league) players
Jersey City Skeeters players
Columbus Senators players